Amyntas IV (Greek: Ἀμύντας Δ΄) was a titular king of the Greek kingdom of Macedonia in 359 BC and member of the Argead dynasty.

Biography 
Amyntas was a son of King Perdiccas III of Macedon. He was born in about 365 BC.

After his father's death in 359 BC he became king, but he was only a child. Philip II of Macedon, Perdiccas’ brother, became his tutor and regent. In that same year Philip declared himself king of Macedonia, expropriating his young nephew.

Amyntas was not judged dangerous enough to be a menace to Philip, who even gave him his daughter Cynane in marriage. The succession of Amyntas’ cousin Alexander in 336 BC changed things — Alexander immediately had Amyntas executed.

Eurydice II of Macedon was Amyntas’ daughter.

References

336 BC deaths
4th-century BC Macedonian monarchs
Argead kings of Macedonia
Monarchs deposed as children
Ancient child monarchs
4th-century BC rulers
People executed by Alexander the Great
Executed royalty of Macedonia (ancient kingdom)
Old Macedonian kingdom
Year of birth unknown
Executed monarchs